The mountain cacique (Cacicus chrysonotus) is a species of bird in the family Icteridae.  It is found in Bolivia, Colombia, Ecuador, Peru, and Venezuela.

Its natural habitat is subtropical or tropical moist montane forests.

It is sometimes split as:
 Southern mountain cacique (Cacicus (chrysonotus) chrysonotus)
 Northern mountain cacique (Cacicus (chrysonotus) leucoramphus)

References

mountain cacique
Birds of the Northern Andes
mountain cacique
Taxonomy articles created by Polbot